"You're the Only Woman (You & I)" is a song by American soft rock band Ambrosia, released in 1980 as the second single from the album One Eighty. 

The song was their fifth and final U.S. top 40 hit, peaking at No. 13 on the U.S. Billboard Hot 100 and No. 5 on the Adult Contemporary chart during late summer/early fall of 1980.

Track listing
U.S. 7-inch single
A. "You're the Only Woman (You & I)" - 4:20
B. "Shape I'm In" - 3:29

Chart performance

Certifications

Other versions
Brat Pack released a cover version on their 1990 self-titled album, peaking at No. 36 on the Billboard Hot 100, and No. 90 in Canada. Ambrosia band member David Pack, who wrote the song, re-recorded it for his 2005 solo album The Secret of Movin' On.

References

1980 songs
1980 singles
Ambrosia (band) songs
Warner Records singles
Songs written by David Pack